John Ruscoe (also Ruskoe)(1623 – 1702) was a founding settler of Norwalk, Connecticut.

He was born in 1623, in Billericay, Essex, England, son of William Ruscoe, and Rebecca. His parents and their four youngest children departed from London aboard the ship Increase in 1635, but his mother Rebecca died on the voyage. John and his brother Nathaniel remained in England, presumably to manage a farm there and to earn money to send to their father until he had established himself in America. This was a common practice at the time. William arrived in Boston in June 1635, and upon arrival soon married the only widow in the Newton settlement, Hester Mussey. In 1836, the family joined Thomas Hooker in settling Hartford.

Shortly after John arrived in Hartford he married Rebecca Beebe. John Ruscoe was one of the fourteen original signers of the Ludlow agreement to create a settlement at Norwalk.

He was the owner of Half-Mile Island, the peninsula located east of Canfield Avenue on Shorehaven Road.

He is listed on the Founders Stone bearing the names of the founding settlers of Norwalk in the East Norwalk Historical Cemetery.

References 
5. Connecticut Nutmegger, Vol 36, 2003, Robert W. Hull, CSG 12,200.

1623 births
1702 deaths
American Puritans
Huguenots
Founding settlers of Norwalk, Connecticut
People from Billericay
People from Essex (before 1965)